Carlos Alberto Buitrago Rojas (born December 16, 1991) is a Nicaraguan professional boxer. He has challenged four times for a world championship: the WBO mini flyweight title in 2013, the IBF mini flyweight title in 2017, and the WBO junior flyweight title in 2018 and 2020.

Professional career
Buitrago challenged for his first world title against Merlito Sabillo for the WBO minimumweight title on November 30, 2013. The fight ended in a split draw, so Sabillo retained the title.

Professional boxing record

References

External links

1991 births
Nicaraguan male boxers
Living people
Mini-flyweight boxers
Sportspeople from Managua